Daehwa Station (Station 309) is an underground metro station on the Ilsan Line, operating as an extension of Line 3 of the Seoul Subway, in Daehwa-dong, Ilsanseo-gu, Goyang, South Korea. The station is Line 3's northwestern terminus and its 6 exits offer access to, among other places, KINTEX (750 m from Exit 1).  Travel time from Daehwa to Seoul Station, changing to Line 1 at Jongno 3(sam)-ga, is 1 hour and 2 minutes, while traveling the full length of Line 3 to Ogeum takes 1 hour and 36 minutes.

Station layout

History
Daehwa Station opened with the rest of the Ilsan line in 1996.

Services
The first train of the day on weekdays (not including national holidays) leaves Daehwa bound for Ogeum at 5:14 a.m., while the last is at 0:36 a.m.

References 

Metro stations in Goyang
Seoul Metropolitan Subway stations
Railway stations opened in 1996
Seoul Subway Line 3